PeopleSoft, Inc. is a company that provides human resource management systems (HRMS), Financial Management Solutions (FMS), supply chain management (SCM), customer relationship management (CRM), and enterprise performance management (EPM) software, as well as software for manufacturing, and student administration to large corporations, governments, and organizations. It existed as an independent corporation until its acquisition by Oracle Corporation in 2005. The PeopleSoft name and product line are now marketed by Oracle.

PeopleSoft Financial Management Solutions (FMS) and Supply Chain Management (SCM) are part of the same package, commonly known as Financials and Supply Chain Management (FSCM).

PeopleSoft Campus Solutions (CS) is a separate package developed as a student information system for colleges and universities.

History 
Founded in 1987 by Ken Morris and David Duffield, PeopleSoft was originally headquartered in Walnut Creek, California, before moving to Pleasanton, California. Duffield envisioned a client–server version of Integral Systems popular mainframe HRMS package. He cofounded PeopleSoft after leaving Integral Systems which was also based in Walnut Creek. It should not be confused with Integral Systems of Columbia, Maryland, a different company. The company's sole venture backing came from IBM.  George J. Still Jr. from Norwest Venture Partners joined the Board of Directors.

PeopleSoft version 1, released in the late 1989, was the first fully integrated, robust client–server HRMS application suite.

PeopleSoft expanded its product range to include a financials module in 1992, distribution in 1994, and manufacturing in 1996 after the acquisition of Red Pepper.

JD Edwards 
In 2003, PeopleSoft performed a friendly merger with smaller rival JD Edwards. The latter's similar product line, World and OneWorld, targeted mid-sized companies too small to benefit from PeopleSoft's applications. JD Edwards' software used the Configurable Network Computing architecture, which shielded applications from both the operating system and the database back-end. PeopleSoft branded the OneWorld product PeopleSoft EnterpriseOne.

Oracle Corporation acquisition 
Beginning in 2003, Oracle began to maneuver for control of the PeopleSoft company.  In June 2003, Oracle made a $13 billion bid in a hostile corporate takeover attempt. In February 2004, Oracle decreased their bid to approximately $9.4 billion; this offer was also rejected by PeopleSoft's board of directors. Complicating Oracle's takeover attempt was PeopleSoft's poison pill, allowing their customers to potentially receive refunds of 2–5 times the amount they had paid in the case of a takeover.

Later that month, the U.S. Department of Justice filed suit to block Oracle, on the grounds that the acquisition would break antitrust laws. In September 2004, the suit was rejected by a U.S. Federal judge, who found that the Justice Department had not proven its antitrust case. In October, the same decision was handed down by the European Commission. Although Oracle had reduced its offer to $7.7 billion in May, it again raised its bid in November to $9.4 billion.

In December 2004, Oracle announced that it had signed a definitive merger agreement to acquire PeopleSoft for approximately $10.3 billion.  A month after the acquisition of PeopleSoft, Oracle cut over half of PeopleSoft's workforce, laying off 6,000 of PeopleSoft's 11,000 employees.

Oracle moved to capitalize on the perceived strong brand loyalty within the JD Edwards user community by rebranding former JD Edwards products. Thus PeopleSoft EnterpriseOne became JD Edwards EnterpriseOne and PeopleSoft World became JD Edwards World. 

Oracle announced in 2005 that Fusion Applications would combine the best aspects of the PeopleSoft, JD Edwards, and Oracle Applications and merge them into a new product suite. 

Oracle would later slow the release cadence for PeopleSoft applications, instead releasing "Feature Packs" to add functionality.

Post-Oracle acquisition 
Under Oracle, PeopleSoft offers different cloud-based software products, including Human Capital Management (HCM), Campus Solutions, Procurement and Supplier Management, Financial Management, and PeopleTools and Technology.

In 2010, PeopleSoft released its In-Memory Project Discovery. It translated unstructured data into structured data, which then allowed users to analyze keywords and data in the Services Automation suite. It ran on Oracle’s Exalytics in-memory machine and Oracle Endeca Information Discovery enterprise data platform. 

In 2015, Oracle PeopleSoft ERP (enterprise resource planning) was an on-premises system capable of running in Windows, Linux, UNIX, and IBM mainframe environments. In 2019, the Department of Foreign Affairs and Trade (DFAT) used the PeopleSoft Enterprise Human Resource platform for time and labor tracking, manager and employee self-service tools, and security.

Product design

Application architecture
The original architecture for the PeopleSoft is a suite of products built on a client–server (two-tier) approach with a dedicated client. With the release of version 8, the entire suite was rewritten as an n-tier web-centric design called PeopleSoft Internet Architecture (PIA). The new format allowed all of a company's business functions to be accessed and run from within a web browser.

Originally, a small number of security and system setup functions still needed to be performed on a fat-client machine; however, this is no longer the case.

The PeopleSoft application suite can function as an ERP system, similar to SAP, but can also be used for single modules - for example, Student Administration or HCM (Human Capital Management) alone.

PeopleSoft uses a functionality now known as Integration Broker to communicate with different modules (known as pillars).  In addition Integration Broker can be utilized for web services calls between PeopleSoft and other applications.

Development platform
Implementation focuses on PeopleSoft's proprietary PeopleTools technology. PeopleTools includes many different components used to create web-based applications: a scripting language known as PeopleCode, design tools to define various types of metadata, standard security structure, batch-processing tools, and the ability to interface with a SQL database. The metadata describes data for user interfaces, tables, messages, security, navigation, portals, etc. This set of tools can make the PeopleSoft suite platform-independent.

Components 
Before PIA version 8.0, Components were called Panel Groups.

PeopleSoft timeline 

 1987: PeopleSoft, Inc. founded by David Duffield and Ken Morris in Walnut Creek, CA, USA.
 1988: PeopleSoft HRMS released.
 1991: Begins opening international offices.
 1994: Public distribution of Distribution and Financials modules.
 1995: Launch of Student Administration System.
 1995: Opened office in Mexico, first in Latin America.
 1996: Releases Manufacturing and PeopleSoft 6, their first ERP package.
 1997: PeopleSoft 7 is released within upgraded ERP modules.
 1998: PeopleSoft 7.5 is released with improved client/server technology.  Acquired Intrepid Systems.
 1998: PeopleSoft Student Administration System was released.
 1999: Craig Conway named new CEO; release products to enable Internet transactions.
 2000: Acquired Vantive Corporation.
 2000: Deliver PeopleSoft 8 with an in-house application service provider.
 2003: Acquired JD Edwards
 2004: Dave Duffield returns as CEO, replacing Craig Conway.
 2005: Acquired by Oracle Corporation.
 2006: PeopleSoft FSCM 9.0 is released. (September 2006)
 2006: PeopleSoft HCM 9.0 is released. (December 2006)
 2009: PeopleSoft HCM 9.1 is released. (October 2009)
 2009: PeopleSoft FSCM 9.1 is released. (November 2009)
 2011: PeopleSoft HCM (Human Capital Management) 9.1 Feature Pack 2 (November 2011)
 2013: PeopleSoft 9.2 is released. (FSCM and HCM released simultaneously)
 2015: PeopleSoft Campus Solutions 9.2 is released (December 2015)

Security

PeopleSoft applications, which address complex business requirements, have some known issues in terms of online security. PeopleSoft was used by Fortune 500 companies and government organizations, and almost 50% of them are vulnerable and can be hacked via the internet, as researchers state.

The risk factor lies in existing vulnerabilities of Oracle PeopleSoft systems that could enable data breaches at businesses, government organizations, and universities.  Because of this, companies using PeopleSoft applications are under constant threat of cyber attacks.

According to the research on public-facing Oracle PeopleSoft applications and their vulnerabilities, systems available online are susceptible to the TokenChpoken attack. A TokenChpoken attack, which affects systems that use Single Sign-On (SSO), is possible because an authentication cookie (PS_TOKEN) used by PeopleSoft applications can be forged. When the PS_TOKEN is identified by a "brute force" TokenChpoken attack, it is possible to log in under a system account and gain access to all data from the compromised system.

Since 2010, several cases have been reported of PeopleSoft security breaches. In March 2013, Salem State University in Massachusetts alerted 25,000 students and employees that their Social Security Numbers might have been compromised in a database breach. Similarly, in February 2016, the University of Central Florida disclosed that over 63,000 student Social Security numbers had been compromised.

All organizations that use PeopleSoft (including companies specialized in charity, food, manufacturing, retail, transport, etc.) stay vulnerable to TokenChpoken and other interventions if they do not pay due attention to security.

See also 
 ADP, Inc.

References 

Software companies established in 1987
Human resource management software
Customer relationship management software companies
ERP software companies
Companies based in Pleasanton, California
Oracle acquisitions
Software companies disestablished in 2005
2005 mergers and acquisitions
Software companies based in the San Francisco Bay Area
Defunct software companies of the United States
Defunct companies based in the San Francisco Bay Area
1987 establishments in California
2005 disestablishments in California